Dalla hilina is a species of butterfly in the family Hesperiidae. It is found in Venezuela.

References

Butterflies described in 1870
hilina
Hesperiidae of South America
Taxa named by Arthur Gardiner Butler